The Great Wave usually refers to The Great Wave off Kanagawa (神奈川沖浪裏), a 19th-Century Japanese woodblock print by Hokusai.

Great Wave or The Great Wave may also refer to:

The Great Wave (book), by David Hackett Fischer, 1996
Great Wave Software, an educational software company
Great Wave Pavilion, or Canglang Pavilion, in Suzhou, Jiangsu province, China
The Great Wave, describing Jewish immigration to New York after 1880
The Great Wave, a 2015 album by Skipping Girl Vinegar
The Great Wave, Sète, a 19th-century photograph by Gustave Le Gray
Great Wave mural, street art in Newtown, Australia
The Great Wave, a 1931 novel by Mona Caird
The Great Wave, a play Francis Turnly at the British National Theatre in 2018 directed by Indhu Rubasingham
"The Great Wave", a 1994 episode of Aaahh!!! Real Monsters
The Great Wave (The Lord of the Rings: The Rings of Power)

See also
The Wave (disambiguation)
Blue Wave (disambiguation)
Julang-1 (Chinese: 巨浪-1, 'Huge Wave-1') missile